The GoldenPass Line is a tourist-orientated train route in the Swiss Alps with its base in Montreux. It is not a legal entity but operates and manages the following companies:

Montreux Oberland Bernois Railway (MOB)

MOB operates the following lines:
Montreux – Zweisimmen
Zweisimmen – Lenk

Transports Montreux-Vevey Riviera (MVR)

MVR operates the following lines:
Montreux – Glion – Les Rochers-de-Naye (train)
Vevey – Blonay – Les Pléiades (train)
Vevey – Chardonne – Mt-Pèlerin (funicular railway)
Territet – Glion (funicular railway)
Les Avants – Sonloup (funicular railway)

Garage Parc Montreux Gare SA (GPMG)
GPMG operates the underground car park at Montreux railway station.

Further reading

External links
 Golden Pass Line website

References

Railway companies of Switzerland
Mountain railways
Tourist attractions in Switzerland